Culcheth is a village in the Borough of Warrington, England, six miles (10 km) north-east of Warrington town centre; it is the principal settlement in Culcheth and Glazebury civil parish.

Culcheth is primarily residential, with a large village green at its heart where the annual Community Day is held. The old railway line is now known as Culcheth Linear Park.

History
On Saxon maps showing South Lancashire the village is marked as "Calchuth" or "Celchyth." On these very early maps and deeds the name is also written as "Kilcheth", "Kylchith" and "Kilshaw." It is derived from the Brittonic "cil" and "coed", 'at the edge of a wood,' 'black wood' or 'retreat in a wood'. There are a few examples of this name-formation today, such as the Welsh name for Caldicot, Monmouthshire, Wales is "Cil-y-coed", and possibly Culgaith, Cumbria. The first element in the name might also be *cǖl, meaning 'narrow'. However, another claim is that the name is of Norman origin, but all four families of French descent which settled in the area took local names, such as de Culcheth, de Kenyon, de Risley and de Holcroft.

The area is known to have been established before or around the time of the Norman conquest, from its mention in the Domesday Book. Culcheth Hall was latterly owned by the Withington family until its demolition after the Second World War.

The infamous Colonel Thomas Blood, who nearly succeeded in stealing the Crown Jewels, was married at Winwick, and lived for a while at Holcroft Hall (on Holcroft Lane, Culcheth).

The Culcheth Laboratories were established in 1950, in the south-west of the village.

Governance and politics

Local Government in Culcheth has been administered by Lancashire County Council (1889-1974), Leigh Rural District Council (1894-1933), Culcheth Parish Council (1894-1933) and Golborne Urban District (1933-1974).

Today, Culcheth is administered by Culcheth and Glazebury Parish Council, as well as by Warrington Borough Council (both since 1974). On 1 April 1998, the Warrington Unitary Authority was created, of which Culcheth is a part.

Culcheth (along with its neighbouring villages Glazebury and Croft) form the Warrington Borough Council ward of Culcheth, Glazebury and Croft. Although the Labour Party took all three seats in this ward in the local elections of 2016, in 2021 they all changed hands to the Conservatives.

The ward forms part of the Warrington North parliamentary constituency, which has been represented by Labour MP Charlotte Nichols since 2019. Nichols replaced Helen Jones as MP, who lives in the village centre with her family.

At the 2012 municipal elections, Chris Vobe (son of Helen Jones MP) became the first Labour Party Councillor for Culcheth since the mid-1990s, taking his seat on Warrington Borough Council at the Town Hall on 14 May 2012, with Culcheth having been represented on Warrington Borough Council by three Conservative councillors from 1996 to 2012. Chris Vobe stood down from his position in 2016.

Cheshire Constabulary has established a police community base in Culcheth Scout Centre in agreement with the local scout group. This innovation allows local police officers to spend more time in the community and makes it easier for people to contact them. Without this arrangement police officers would have to be based at Warrington Police Station, which is several miles away from their 'beat'.

Transport

Road
One of the reasons for Culcheth's popularity as a place to live is its proximity to the main road links into Warrington (A574), and the M62 motorway into Liverpool and Manchester. It is also accessible via Common Lane (the B5207 from Lowton), linking to the A580 East Lancashire Road, and Holcroft Lane (the B5212) which meets the A57 Warrington-Manchester road near Warburton Toll Bridge.

Bus
Warrington's Own Buses operate two bus services between Warrington town centre and Leigh via the village centre. A combined 30-minute frequency is provided by services 19 and 28/28A on Monday to Saturday daytimes, with a combined 30-minute frequency on Sundays and an hourly 28E service Monday to Saturday evening. The two services operate via the same route to Leigh, but the route to Warrington alternates between Croft/Winwick (service 19) and Birchwood/Padgate (service 28/28A).

Rail
Between 1884 and 1964, Culcheth was served by two railway stations on the Great Central Railway (GCR) line from Manchester Central between Glazebrook and Wigan Central railway station. These have been turned into Culcheth Linear Park, with the park's HQ situated on top of Culcheth station's foundations.

The nearest operating railway stations are at Birchwood and Glazebrook, both on the line from Liverpool Lime Street to Manchester Piccadilly.

Economy

The science and business parks at nearby Birchwood employ around 5,000 people. The Taylor Industrial Estate / Taylor Business Park provides rented premises and facilities to many small and medium-sized businesses on the outskirts of the village on the road between Culcheth and Risley.

There are two supermarkets in the village centre, the Co-Op and Sainsbury's, as well as a wide range of smaller specialist shops.

There is also CPS shopping centre which is located in the centre of Culcheth village, and has been home to a wide variety of small independent shops for more than 50 years.

There are three pubs in Culcheth: the Cherry Tree, the Culcheth Arms (formerly Harrow Inn) and the Pack Horse. Nearby Glazebury also has several pubs: the Raven Inn (now closed), the Glazebury (formerly Chat Moss Hotel), the Grey Horse, the Comfortable Gill and the George and Dragon.

Partridge Lakes Fishery on Glaziers Lane is a recreational coarse fishery with a lakeside dog friendly cafe.

Bent's Garden Centre, located on the outskirts of Glazebury in the grounds of the former Hurst Hall, is a large upmarket enterprise which also has a restaurant.

Black Sheep Wools is located on Glaziers Lane, the Uk's largest yarn and stitching store.

Religion

Culcheth has four churches: Newchurch Parish Church, Culcheth Methodist Church, Culcheth Christian Fellowship, Hob Hey Lane and the Grace Fellowship Church which meets at Culcheth High School. The nearest Roman Catholic church is St Lewis's, which is in the nearby village of Croft.

Education
The village is well provided with schools. Culcheth High School opened in 1931, and received a 'good' rating by Ofsted (2014), with 'The Class of 2013' attaining the best results the school has produced so far, with 79% of pupils attaining 5 A*-C GCSEs including English and Maths. The school also had a successful sixth form which closed in 2014. The school was picked as Warrington's 'Pathfinder' school under the now-defunct 'Building Schools for the Future' scheme, and the brand new school buildings opened in July 2010. The old school buildings were demolished to make way for the new school playing fields.

The village also has three primary schools: Twiss Green Community Primary School (rated "outstanding" by OFSTED), Culcheth Community Primary School and Newchurch Community Primary School.

Sport
Leigh Golf Club is located to the north of Culcheth.

The Culcheth Sports Club (formerly the Daten) provides a wide range of sports facilities such as table tennis, cricket, tennis, croquet and bowls. The Sports Club also has teams in various leagues in different sports, including numerous table tennis teams, a football team, a tennis league and a croquet team.

Culcheth Eagles ARLFC is a successful rugby league team, which runs many youth teams and an open age team, which all compete in the North West Counties leagues.

FC Culcheth Sports is a newly established football club in the village with teams in the Wigan and District Amateur League and the Warrington Sunday League.

Culture and community

The Culcheth and Glazebury Christmas Market (formerly Victorian Day) is a village event held in late November each year with gazebos and market stalls complementing the Gift and Craft Fayres taking place in the Parish and Methodist Halls. The whole event is crowned by carols and the Christmas light switch-on at the village green.

Notable people

 Sir Thomas Holcroft (1505 in Holcroft Hall, Culcheth – 1558) was an English courtier, soldier, politician and landowner. 
 Colonel Thomas Blood (1618–1680) adventurer, made a failed attempt to steal the Crown Jewels, may have lived in Culcheth.
 Walton Newbold (1888 in Culcheth – 1943) the first of the four Communist Party of Great Britain members to be elected as MPs in the United Kingdom
 Roger Hunt MBE (born 1938 in Glazebury) an English former footballer, 404 appearances for Liverpool F.C. with 286 goals, member of England's 1966 World Cup-winning team
 Donald Adamson (born 1939 in Culcheth) a British literary scholar, author and historian
 Helen Jones (born 1954), former MP for Warrington North, lives in Culcheth.
 Daniel Ryan (born 1968 ) an English actor  and writer.
 Andy Burnham (born 1970) is a British Labour politician, Mayor of Greater Manchester since May 2017, previously the MP for Leigh from 2001 to 2017. He was brought up in Culcheth.

Twin town
Saint-Leu-la-Foret near Paris

See also

Listed buildings in Culcheth and Glazebury

References
Notes

Bibliography

External links

Warrington
Geography of Warrington
Villages in Cheshire